The Twilight Samurai  is a 2002 Japanese historical drama film co-written and directed by Yoji Yamada and starring Hiroyuki Sanada and Rie Miyazawa. Set in mid-19th century Japan, a few years before the Meiji Restoration, it follows the life of Seibei Iguchi, a low-ranking samurai employed as a bureaucrat. Poor, but not destitute, he still manages to lead a content and happy life with his daughters and his mother, who has dementia. Through an unfortunate turn of events, the turbulent times conspire against him.

The film was inspired by the short story "The Bamboo Sword" by Shuhei Fujisawa. The Twilight Samurai won an unprecedented 12 Japanese Academy Awards, including Best Picture, Best Director, Best Actor, Best Actress, and Best Screenplay. The Twilight Samurai was also nominated for the Academy Award for Best Foreign Language Film at the 76th Academy Awards.

Plot
At the start of the film, the main character, Iguchi Seibei, becomes a widower when his wife succumbs to tuberculosis. His wife receives a grand funeral, more than Seibei, a low-ranking samurai can afford. Seibei works in the grain warehouse, keeping inventory for the clan. His samurai colleagues mock him behind his back with the nickname Tasogare (Twilight): when evening approaches, Seibei rushes home to look after his elderly mother, who has dementia, and two young daughters, Kayano and Ito, instead of bonding with his supervisor and other samurai colleagues over customary nights of dinner, geisha entertainment, and sake drinking. Even though he is a samurai, Seibei neglects his appearance, failing to bathe or shave his head, and being shabbily dressed. The well-being of his young daughters and medicine for his mother take priority over new clothes or the monthly bath fee, and his daughters say they are both happy, even without a mother.

Things change when Seibei's childhood friend Tomoe (sister of Iinuma Michinojo, one of his better, kinder samurai friends and much higher ranked in the clan) returns to town. Tomoe is atypical in that she was a tom-boy as a child and as an adult questions points of etiquette, such as obeying her elder brother's wife and not attending peasant festivals. Recently divorced from an abusive alcoholic husband (Koda, a samurai captain), Tomoe finds comfort and solace with Seibei's daughters. Tomoe's ex-husband Koda barges into the household of Michinojo in the middle of night in a drunken demand for Tomoe and challenges Michinojo to a duel which Seibei accepts on Michinojo's behalf believing Michinojo could not win. This takes place with Seibei knowing his clan forbids duels and the penalty is usually death for the winner as the loser is already dead. Michinojo arrives before Seibei and is facing Koda. Seibei interrupts and decides to use only a wooden stick whilst Koda brandishes a steel katana. Koda, after being disarmed and asked if that can be the end of it, picks up his sword so Seibei knocks him unconscious, sparing both their lives. A few days later, Captain of the Guard Yogo passes by Seibei while Seibei is working in the stores and quietly announces he is friends with Koda who has asked him for help in seeking vengeance on Seibei. Recognising that Seibei has some skill and learning that Seibei has learnt a particular style of fighting Yogo hopes they can duel someday. Seibei's workmates learn of the duel and wonder if they should stop calling him by his nickname.

When Iinuma Michinojo asks Seibei to marry his sister, saying she has turned down many offers and he will not force her, Seibei feels that Iinuma is teasing him for his strong feelings for Tomoe, like when he, Iinuma, and Tomoe were children. Iinuma knows Tomoe's feeling for Seibei, and Seibei is a kind man who would treat Tomoe better than Koda. With much deep regret, Seibei declines Iinuma's offer of his sister's hand in marriage, citing his inferior social status and how he did not want to see Tomoe share the burden of poverty despite Michinojo's protest that Tomoe is a grown woman who knows what she is up for. Seibei stoically regrets how his departed wife suffered in his care who, like Tomoe, came from a wealthier family. Iinuma talks no more of it. Tomoe stops visiting Kayano and Ito.

In the final act, the ranking official of Seibei's clan, having heard of his prowess with a sword, orders Seibei to kill Yogo, who has been "disowned" and who stubbornly refuses to resign his post by committing seppuku. The young lord of the clan had died from measles and there was a succession struggle behind the scenes over who will be the new lord. Yogo ended up on the losing side of this conflict, hence his ordered suicide. Yogo has already killed a formidable samurai that was sent to kill him. Seibei is promised a rise in rank and pay if he accepts the dangerous mission.

Seibei is very reluctant to fight Yogo at first, requesting one month to prepare for it. He says that, because of great hardship in his life, he has lost all resolve to fight with ferocity and disregard for his own life, because of the experience of watching his two girls grow. As they continue to insist, he requests two days to get himself up to the task. The new clan leader is furious over this answer and orders him expelled from the clan. Seibei is finally forced to agree to attempt the mission. Upon parting that evening, Seibei's supervisor (who was present during the meeting) promises him that he will make sure the girls will be taken care of if the worst comes to pass.

The following morning, Seibei attempts to get ready, but there is no one to help him with the rituals of samurai before battle. With no one to turn to, he asks Tomoe for her assistance. Before he leaves, he tells Tomoe that he was wrong to decline the offer of marriage. He says that if he lives, he would like to ask for her hand in marriage now that there is promise of a promotion. She regretfully tells Seibei she has accepted another proposal. Seibei, feeling like a fool, tells Tomoe to forget about the silly conversation. Tomoe says that she will not be waiting at his household for him to return but that she hopes from her heart that he will return safely. Seibei says he understands completely. He thanks Tomoe for her generosity for assisting him in this final ritual.

At Yogo's house, Seibei finds his target drinking alcohol in a dark, fly-infested room. Yogo recognizes Seibei and invites him to sit and drink. He then asks Seibei to allow him to run away. He explains he was only faithfully serving his master and describes how his wife and daughter also died of tuberculosis due to hardship and spending seven years as a ronin. Only thanks to his master's generosity could he afford a proper funeral. Yogo tells Seibei that he expects Seibei was promised a reward for this errand and that he too performed errands for his superior, taking the word of his superior as the word of the clan. Seibei commiserates and reveals further parallels in the two men's stories, such as that his wife's family demanded she have an expensive funeral and so he sold his katana to pay for it. He reveals that his long scabbard contains a fake bamboo sword. This angers Yogo who believes Seibei is mocking him: the short kodachi can be carried even by common people who are not samurai. Seibei explains he has been trained with the short sword, which he still carries, but Yogo is not placated.

Seibei's kodachi fighting style is matched up against Yogo's ittō-ryū (single long sword) swordsmanship in an intense close quarters duel. Despite allowing Yogo to slash him several times and offering him chances to flee, Yogo presses the attack and Seibei kills Yogo when his longer sword gets caught in the rafters. Despite his wounds, Seibei limps home. Kayano and Ito rush to him in the courtyard, happy to see him. Tomoe is still there, waiting in the house. They have an emotional reunion.

In a brief epilogue set many years later, Seibei's younger daughter, Ito, now elderly, visits the grave of Seibei and Tomoe. Narrating, she explains they married but that their happiness was not to last: He died three years later in the Boshin War, Japan's last civil war. Tomoe took care of Seibei's daughters until they were both married. Ito often heard that Tasogare Seibei was a very unfortunate character, a most pathetic samurai with no luck at all. Ito disagrees: Her father never had any ambition to become anything special; he loved his two daughters, and was loved by the beautiful Tomoe.

Cast
Hiroyuki Sanada as Seibei Iguchi
Rie Miyazawa as Tomoe Iinuma
Nenji Kobayashi as Choubei Kusaka
Ren Osugi as Toyotarou Kouda
Mitsuru Fukikoshi as Michinojo Iinuma
Hiroshi Kanbe as Naota
Miki Itō as Kayano Iguchi
Erina Hashiguchi as Ito Iguchi
Reiko Kusamura as Iguchi's Mother
Min Tanaka as Zenemon Yogo
Keiko Kishi as Ito, as an old woman
Tetsuro Tamba as Tozaemon Iguchi

Reception

Box office
In Japan, the film grossed  in 2002, becoming the year's 16th top-grossing film at the Japanese box office. Overseas, the film grossed $593,547, including $559,765 in North America. This adds up to a total of  grossed worldwide.

Critical reaction
The Twilight Samurai has a rating of 99% at Rotten Tomatoes, based on 70 reviews, and an average rating of 8.14/10, and is certified as "Fresh". The website's critical consensus states, "Samurai epic as a touching drama". Metacritic
gave it an overall score of 82 out of 100, based on 25 critics, indicating "universal acclaim".

Stephen Hunter of The Washington Post stated "This is an absolutely brilliant film but in a quiet way."

Roger Ebert of The Chicago Sun-Times gave it a four-star (out of four) rating saying "Seibei's story is told by director Yoji Yamada in muted tones and colors, beautifully re-creating a feudal village that still retains its architecture, its customs, its ancient values, even as the economy is making its way of life obsolete."

The second film of the trilogy, The Hidden Blade (2004), was the choice of Edward Douglas in IndieWire's 2018 list of the best Japanese films of the 21st century, but Douglas said that The Twilight Samurai came close.

Awards and nominations
The Twilight Samurai won an unprecedented 12 Japanese Academy Awards, including Best Picture, Best Director, Best Actor, Best Actress, and Best Screenplay.

The film also won the following awards:

Award of the Japanese Academy (2003)
Blue Ribbon Awards (2003)
Hawaii International Film Festival (2003)
Hochi Film Award (2002)
Hong Kong Film Award (2004)
Kinema Junpo Award (2003)
Mainichi Film Concours (2003)
Nikkan Sports Film Award (2002)
Udine Far East Film Festival (2004)

The film also received several award nominations. The Twilight Samurai was nominated for the Academy Award for Best Foreign Language Film at the 76th Academy Awards, Japan's first in twenty-two years, losing to the French Canadian (Québec) film The Barbarian Invasions (Les Invasions barbares).

Soundtrack
Composer: Isao Tomita
Theme song: "Kimerareta Rizumu" ("The Rhythm which is Decided"), sung by Yōsui Inoue.

References

External links

 
The Twilight Samurai at JMDb (in Japanese)

The Twilight Samurai at Metacritic
 

2002 films
2000s Japanese films
2000s Japanese-language films
Best Film Kinema Junpo Award winners
Films directed by Yoji Yamada
Films scored by Isao Tomita
Films set in Bakumatsu
Films with screenplays by Yôji Yamada
Picture of the Year Japan Academy Prize winners
Samurai films
Shochiku films